Abdallah Tazi (born 30 November 1944), also transliterated Abdellah or Abdullah, is a Moroccan footballer who played for Morocco in the 1972 Summer Olympics and 1978 African Cup of Nations. He also played for Moghreb Athletic Club.

References

External links
 
 
 

1944 births
Living people
Moroccan footballers
Morocco international footballers
1972 African Cup of Nations players
1976 African Cup of Nations players
1978 African Cup of Nations players
Africa Cup of Nations-winning players
Footballers at the 1972 Summer Olympics
Olympic footballers of Morocco
Maghreb de Fès players
Botola players
Association football midfielders